Dževad Prekazi (born 18 August 1957) is a former footballer who played as a midfielder.

Club career
Born in Mitrovica to ethnic Albanian parents, Prekazi made his first football steps at his local club Remont, being registered for their youth team in early 1974. He soon gained attention as one of the most promising young talents in Yugoslav football and signed with Partizan in December 1974. With the Crno-beli, Prekazi won the Yugoslav First League three times (1975–76, 1977–78, and 1982–83).

In the 1984 winter transfer window, Prekazi switched to fellow Yugoslav First League club Hajduk Split. He spent less than a year at Poljud, before moving to the United States and joining the Baltimore Blast of the Major Indoor Soccer League.

In the summer of 1985, Prekazi returned to Europe and signed with Turkish side Galatasaray. He played for the club over the next six and a half years, collecting 185 league appearances and scoring 40 goals, while helping them win back-to-back championship titles in 1986–87 and 1987–88.

In late 1991, Prekazi departed Galatasaray and joined Altay until the end of the 1991–92 season. He also briefly played for Bakırköyspor in the fall of 1992. After returning to Yugoslavia, Prekazi ended his playing career with Trudbenik in the Serbian League North.

International career
Prekazi represented Yugoslavia at the 1976 UEFA European Under-18 Championship. He was also capped for Yugoslavia at under-21 level.

Post-playing career
After hanging up his boots, Prekazi served as manager of Železnik on two occasions. He also worked in the youth setups at Sinđelić Beograd, OFK Beograd, and Partizan.

Personal life
Born to Kosovo Albanian parents, Prekazi identifies himself as Yugoslav. He also holds Turkish citizenship. His older brother, Ljuan, also played for Partizan. Prekazi had a Muslim upbringing and considers himself a "liberal Muslim".

Career statistics

Honours
Partizan
 Yugoslav First League: 1975–76, 1977–78, 1982–83
Galatasaray
 1.Lig: 1986–87, 1987–88

Notes

References

External links

 NASL stats
 

Altay S.K. footballers
Association football midfielders
Bakırköyspor footballers
Baltimore Blast (1980–1992) players
Expatriate footballers in Turkey
Expatriate soccer players in the United States
FK Partizan non-playing staff
FK Partizan players
FK Železnik managers
Galatasaray S.K. footballers
HNK Hajduk Split players
Kosovo Albanians
Major Indoor Soccer League (1978–1992) players
Naturalized citizens of Turkey
Sportspeople from Mitrovica, Kosovo
Süper Lig players
Turkish people of Albanian descent
Turkish people of Yugoslav descent
Yugoslav expatriate footballers
Yugoslav expatriate sportspeople in the United States
Yugoslav expatriate sportspeople in Turkey
Yugoslav First League players
Yugoslav footballers
Yugoslav people of Albanian descent
Yugoslavia under-21 international footballers
1957 births
Living people